Radio in Colombia started in the early 1920s when a group of radio amateurs and enthusiasts brought the first receivers to the country,  mostly in order to listen broadcasts from Europe and the United States. Broadcasting started in September 1929, with state-owned HJN, predecessor of Radiodifusora Nacional de Colombia, and privately run La Voz de Barranquilla (HKD).

As of 2011, Colombia has three major national radio networks: state-run Radiodifusora Nacional de Colombia and private networks Caracol Radio and RCN Radio, with hundreds of affiliates. These networks appeared in the 1940s.

There are other national networks, including Cadena Super, Todelar, Organización Radial Olímpica, and Colmundo, among others.

References 

 
Mass media in Colombia